Enneapterygius rubicauda, the redtail triplefin, is a species of triplefin blenny in the genus Enneapterygius. It was described by Shen Shih-Chieh in 1994. They occur in the western Pacific Ocean, including the Ryukyu and Ogasawara Islands, Taiwan, Philippines, New Caledonia and Vanuatu.

References

rubicauda
Taxa named by Shen Shih-Chieh
Fish described in 1994